Cielo is the largest Brazilian credit and debit card operator. Cielo is the biggest payment system company in Latin America by revenue and market value.

History
Companhia Brasileira de Meios de Pagamento (Brazilian Company of Means of Payment), dba VisaNet, was founded in 1995 as a joint-venture between Visa International and the banks Bradesco, Banco do Brasil, Banco Real (currently Banco Santander), and the now defunct Banco Nacional. Its purpose was to create a common infrastructure to be used by all banks issuing Visa cards, instead of each bank having a separate technological solution to process credit card transactions.

On July 1, 2010, VisaNet was renamed Cielo and was no longer the only processor of Visa cards in Brasil, following a regulation by the Brazilian government. Its main competitor, Rede, was now allowed to process Visa cards, and Cielo was allowed to process Mastercard, Diners Club and other cards which were only processed by Redecard.

IPO
VisaNet debuted on the São Paulo Stock Exchange on June 29, 2010 listed in Novo Mercado. It was the third largest IPO in the history of Bovespa, only behind Banco Santander Brasil and BB Seguridade. The company raised the equivalent of R$ 8.397 billion or US$ 4.428 billion through the sale of 559.8 million ordinary shares, 41% of the shares of the company.

References

Companies listed on B3 (stock exchange)
Companies based in São Paulo (state)
Financial services companies of Brazil
Financial services companies established in 1997
Brazilian brands